Nostie is a small remote hamlet, lying on Nostie Bay, an inlet at the northeastern end of the sea loch, Loch Alsh in the Scottish Highlands and is in the council area of Highland. Nostie lies a short distance from one of Scotland's popular tourist attractions, Eilean Donan Castle.
It is the home of the well known young Scottish harpist, Murdo Macrae, and was also the home village of the late Reverend Kenneth MacLeod.

Populated places in Lochalsh